Speicher is a municipality in the canton of Appenzell Ausserrhoden, in Switzerland.

History

Speicher is first mentioned in 1309 as Spicher.  The name originated in the Middle Ages, during the heyday of the Abbey of Saint Gall.  At that time the village church served as a granary of the monastery.  The first battle of the Appenzell Wars was fought at the village of Vögelinsegg, near Speicher in 1403.  A monument to the battle, a pointing Appenzell farmer with a morning star, was built in 1903 on the ridge of Vögelinsegg.

A right of way had to be blasted through the rock at Vögelinsegg to lay the track for the Trogenerbahn in 1900.

Geography

Of this area, 54.8% is used for agricultural purposes, while 28.6% is forested. Of the rest of the land, 16.1% is settled (buildings or roads) and the remainder (0.5%) is non-productive (rivers, glaciers or mountains).

The municipality is located in the former District of Mittelland.  Until the 1950s the municipality was lightly settled with scattered farmhouses and two small settlements, Speicher and Speicherschwendi.  Both have expanded into larger villages since then.

Demographics
Speicher has a population of 4,012, of which about 8.5% are foreign nationals.  Over the last 10 years the population has grown at a rate of 1.8%.  Most of the population speaks German  (93.5%), with Spanish being second most common ( 1.3%) and Albanian being third ( 0.9%).

, the gender distribution of the population was 49.5% male and 50.5% female.  The age distribution, in Speicher is; 298 people or 7.7% of the population are between 0–6 years old.  477 people or 12.4% are 6-15, and 190 people or 4.9% are 16-19.  Of the adult population, 164 people or 4.3% of the population are between 20–24 years old.  1,104 people or 28.7% are 25-44, and 1,077 people or 28.0% are 45-64.  The senior population distribution is 405 people or 10.5% of the population are between 65–79 years old, and  138 people or 3.6% are over 80.

In the 2007 federal election the FDP received 72.2% of the vote.

In Speicher about 78% of the population (between age 25-64) have completed either non-mandatory upper secondary education or additional higher education (either university or a Fachhochschule).

Speicher has an unemployment rate of 1.2%.  , there were 86 people employed in the primary economic sector and about 34 businesses involved in this sector.  256 people are employed in the secondary sector and there are 47 businesses in this sector.  617 people are employed in the tertiary sector, with 156 businesses in this sector.

The historical population is given in the following table:

Education 
Speicher is home to five kindergartens, one primary school and a secondary school.  Students who continue on to advanced secondary attend Gymnasium in Trogen.

Sights
The Holzpalast house in the municipality is listed as a heritage site of national significance.

Sports
Tennis Hall
Indoor swimming pool with gym 
Sports facilities with artificial turf skate park and outdoor handball field
Beach volleyball
Various sports clubs: FC-Speicher, TV-Speicher, Uni hockey, tennis club
Cross-country ski in the winter
Vita-Parcours

Transport
Speicher is linked to the city of St. Gallen by the Appenzell–St. Gallen–Trogen railway, a narrow-gauge road-side railway line. The line operates two trains per hour throughout the day, with four trains per hour during peak periods. The journey from Speicher to St. Gallen takes 28 minutes and all the way to Appenzell 67 minutes.

References

Cultural property of national significance in Appenzell Ausserrhoden
Municipalities of Appenzell Ausserrhoden